Stipe Damjanović (born 14 September 1969) is a Croatian wrestler. He competed at the 1992 Summer Olympics and the 1996 Summer Olympics.

References

1969 births
Living people
Croatian male sport wrestlers
Olympic wrestlers of Croatia
Wrestlers at the 1992 Summer Olympics
Wrestlers at the 1996 Summer Olympics
Sportspeople from Livno